Ashmyany or Oshmyany is a town in Grodno Region, Belarus, located  from Vilnius in Lithuania. The town is the administrative center of Ashmyany District. It lies in Ashmyanka's river basin. 

The town was the birthplace of the general Lucjan Żeligowski and Jewish Soviet partisan Abba Kovner.

Name
Since time immemorial, Ašmena and its surroundings were ethnic Lithuanian territory.  However, many of the indigenous inhabitants died out during the wars, famine and plague in the late 17th and the early 18th centuries, and the number of Slavic colonists grew. Lithuanians were slavicized along the Minsk-Ašmena-Vilnius axis, and by the mid-19th century, the numbers of Lithuanian-speakers had severely decreased.

Presently, its Lithuanian past is sealed in the towns's name, which is of Lithuanian origin. The town's name is derived from the name of the Ašmena (modern Ashmyanka River), itself derived from the Lithuanian word akmuo (stone). The link between consonants š and k is old and present in the Lithuanian words, respectively  ašmuo (sharp blade) and akmuo (stone). The present name Ashmyany uses the plural form of the name and is a modern invention. Through the ancient town's history, its name was recorded in the Lithuanian singular form.

History

Grand Duchy of Lithuania

14th century
Ašmena is mentioned first as a town in the Duchy of Vilnius in the 1350s. The first reliable mention of Ašmena is in the Lithuanian Chronicles, which tells that after Gediminas' death in 1341, Jaunutis inherited the town. In 1384, the Teutonic Order attacked and destroyed the town with the goal of destroying Jogaila's hereditary state. The Teutons recorded the town as "Aschemynne". The Teutons managed to destroy the town, but it quickly recovered. By 1384, there is a manor of the Grand Duke of Lithuania in Ašmena. The Roman Catholic  was built after 1387. This church was one of the first in the whole of the Grand Duchy of Lithuania. The church was administrated by the Franciscans.

15th century
In 1402, the Teutons attacked once more, but were bloodily repelled, so the Teutons withdrew to Medininkai. In 1413, the town became one of the most notable trade and commerce centres within the Vilnius Voivodship. Hence, in 1432 Ashmyany became the site of an important battle between the royal forces of Jogaila under Žygimantas Kęstutaitis and the forces of Švitrigaila, who was allied with the Teutonic Order. After the town was taken by the royalists, it became the private property of the Grand Dukes of Lithuania and started to develop rapidly. 

Hanseatic trade routes passed through the town in the 15th century. On 1 September 1432, Švitrigaila was deposed from the throne in Ašmena. On 8 December 1432, Ašmena was the site of the Battle of Ašmena between Švitrigaila and Sigismund Kęstutaitis. There was a residential palace in Ašmena from the early 15th century to the end of the 18th century.

16th century
The Church of the Assumption of the Blessed Virgin Mary into Heaven burnt down in 1505, but was rebuilt. The Muscovite army destroyed and burnt Ašmena to the ground in 1519, during the Fourth Lithuanian–Muscovite War. The town was granted the Magdeburg rights in the 16th century.

Ashmyany did not recover as quickly as previously after 1519, and in 1537 the town was granted several royal privileges to facilitate its reconstruction. In 1566, the town finally received Magdeburg rights, which were confirmed in 1683 (along with the privileges for the local merchants and burghers) by King John III Sobieski. In the 16th century the town was one of the most notable centers of Calvinism in the Polish–Lithuanian Commonwealth, after Mikołaj "the Red" Radziwiłł founded a college and a church there.

17th century
The Muscovite army occupied Ašmena in 1655. Due to the widespread destruction and impoverishment during the Deluge, the town was exempt from taxes in 1655, 1661 and 1667. In 1667, the Dominican Order  was built.

18th century
In 1792, King Stanisław August Poniatowski confirmed all previous privileges and the fact, that Oszmiany, as it was then called, was a free city, subordinate only to the king and the local city council. With this, the town received its first ever Coat of arms. Composed of three fields, it featured a shield, a hand holding scales and the bull from Ciołek coat of arms, the monarch's personal coat of arms.

During the Uprising of 1794, Ašmena was the site of the insurgent staff under Jokūbas Jasinskis. At the same time, an insurgent group led by Mykolas Kleopas Oginskis was organised in the town. In 1795, the town was annexed by the Russian Empire in the last Partition of Poland–Lithuania. The Church of Saint Michael the Archangel burnt down in 1797 but was rebuilt.

19th century
The Church of the Assumption of the Blessed Virgin Mary into Heaven was also rebuilt in bricks in 1812; however, the church decayed over the 19th century. During the French invasion of Russia, the Grande Armée took over Ašmena in 1812, and during several battles, the town partially burnt down.

November Uprising (1830-1831)
During the November Uprising, it was liberated by the town's citizens, led by a local priest, Jasiński, and Colonel Count Karol Dominik Przeździecki. However, in April 1831, in the face of a Russian offensive, the fighters were forced to withdraw to the Naliboki forest. After a minor skirmish with Stelnicki's rearguard, the Russian punitive expeditionary force of some 1,500 officers and soldiers proceeded to burn the town and massacre the civilian population, including some 500 women, children and elderly, who sought refuge in the Dominican Catholic Church. Even the local priest was murdered. Nothing is known of the fate of Ashmyany's Jews. In the Uprising of 1831, the Imperial Russian Army razed the town and massacred 150 locals in one of the town's churches.

Rebuilding
In 1845, as the town was rebuilding, it received a new coat of arms, in recognition of its population increase. It never recovered from its earlier losses, and by the end of the 19th century it became rather a provincial town, inhabited primarily by Jewish immigrants from other parts of Russia 'beyond the Pale'.

The Church of Saint Michael the Archangel was closed down in 1850, but rebuilt in 1900–10. In the late 19th century, a tavern was built and the Russian authorities built a Russian Orthodox church.

20th century
In 1912 the local Jewish community built a large synagogue.

World War I
After the end of World War I and the withdrawal of the German army in 1919, Ashmyany was under Polish jurisdiction. Bolshevik activity threatened the town. The Polish armed forces defended the town against the invading Bolsheviks, and there still exist graves of Polish soldiers who died in that struggle. According to the Soviet–Lithuanian Peace Treaty, signed on 12 July 1920, Ašmena was part of Lithuania. However, the Lithuanian territory was seized by the Polish Army that same year. After the Polish–Soviet War, Ashmyany was given to Poland by the Peace of Riga.

In interwar Poland
It was a county center, first of Wilno Land, then of Wilno Voivodeship during Polish rule. The town was capital of Oszmiana County. According to the census from 1931, Poles constituted 81% of the inhabitants of the Oszmiana County. On the other hand, Poles and Jews dominated the town of Oszmiana.

World War II

Soviet occupation
Following the Soviet-German invasion of Poland in 1939, the Soviet Union occupied the area until 1941. Ashmyany was given to the Byelorussian Soviet Socialist Republic. Ashmyany was a raion center in Vileyka Voblast between 1939 and 1941. At the very end of the Soviet occupation, on the night of June 22 and morning of June 23, 1941, the NKVD murdered and buried in one mass grave 57 Polish prisoners from Ashmyany.

German occupation
During the Nazi occupation, which began June 25, 1941, the Jews of Ashmyany and their spiritual leader Rabbi Zew Wawa Morejno were ghettoized. After the Wehrmacht drove out the Soviet occupiers, Ašmena was part of the Generalbezirk Litauen in Reichskommissariat Ostland in 1941-1944.

Soviet reoccupation
On July 7, 1944, it was reoccupied by the Red Army during the Vilnius offensive. In 1945, the town was annexed by the USSR to the Byelorussian SSR. After 1944, the town was once more part of Vileyka Voblast, and between 1944 and 1960 it was incorporated into Molodechno Voblast until that Voblast was disestablished. At that point Ashmyany became part of the Hrodna Voblast, where it remains today.

Recent history
Since 1991, it has been a part of Belarus.

Demography 
 1848 – 4,115 inhabitants
 1859 – 3,066 inhabitants 
 1871 – 4,546 inhabitants 
 1880 – 5,050 inhabitants (2501 Jews, 2175 Roman Catholics, 352 Orthodoxs) 
 1897 – 6,400   or 7124 inhabitants 
 1907/08 – 8,300 inhabitants 
 1914 – 8,200 inhabitants
 1921 – 6,000 inhabitants 
 1939 – 8,500 inhabitants
 1970 – 9,621 inhabitants
 1974 – 10,000 inhabitants (Great Soviet Encyclopedia)
 1991 – 15,200 inhabitants 
 2004 – 14,900 inhabitants 
 2006 – 14,600 inhabitants 
 2007 – 14,269 inhabitants

Landmarks

 Catholic church of St. Michael the Archangel
 Catholic church of Franciscan, built in 1822
 Synagogue, built in 1912
 Orthodox church of Resurrection, built in 1875
 Watermill

Gallery

Miscellaneous
Alternate names: Oshmianka (Polish), Oszmiana, Aschemynne, Oshmyany, Ašmena, Oshmana, Oshmene, Oshmina, Osmiany, Oszmiana, Ozmiana, Osmiana, Oßmiana, Possibly Oschmjansky (Middle Ages maps)
Mentioned in: Memoirs of Baron Lejeune, Volume II, Chapter VII.

Climate
This climatic region is typified by large seasonal temperature differences, with warm to hot (and often humid) summers and cold (sometimes severely cold) winters. According to the Köppen climate classification system, Ashmyany has a humid continental climate, abbreviated "Dfb" on climate maps.

References

Bibliography

External links

 Current coat of arms of Ashmiany
 Lejeune book
 The History of Oshmana by Hosea Soltz (Tel Aviv)
 Photos on Radzima.org
 PolishRoots Description
 www.bfcollection.net
 www.tourgrodno.by
 www.eilatgordinlevitan.com
 Population of Ashmyany by mother tongue in 1897

 
Ashmyany District
Holocaust locations in Belarus
Jewish communities destroyed in the Holocaust
Mass murder in 1941
Oshmyansky Uyezd
Populated places established in the 14th century
Populated places in Grodno Region
Shtetls
Struve Geodetic Arc
Asmiany
Vilnius Voivodeship
Wilno Voivodeship (1926–1939)